Computers and software have been used in dental medicine since the 1960s. Since then, computers and information technology have spread progressively in dental practice. According to one study, in 2000, 85.1% of all dentists in the United States were using computers.

Classification 
Schleyer and Kirshner categorized dental software as administrative, clinical, and for the Internet. Zimmerman et al. categorized dental software functions for administration and management of patients documentation, electronic archives of the documentation, telecommunication, computer - aided education, computerizing instruments and techniques in the dental office software assisting with clinical decision making.

Patient records management dental software 
Patient records management dental software is used by the dentist to organize the records of the patients in their practice. The computer patients management software is used for collecting, managing, saving, and retrieving medical information for the patients, and for creating reports for the patients. Computers in dentistry were first used to record dental archives as an alternative of paper dental documentation. Later, the term "computer based dental documentation" was replaced with the term electronic patient record (EPR) since the latter better describes the method and the environment in which the patient record is being managed. An official 1991 report of the Institute of Medicine of the National Academies in Washington, USA gave definitions about what functions must implement a computer based system for health documentation.

The American Dental Association (ADA) created specification number 1000 and number 1004 concerning the structure and the content of the electronic health record. The medical data include identification and contact data, date of next visit, number of previous visits, anamnestic, clinical and paraclinical data, applied treatment, and treatment results data. Patient Records Management Dental Software is the most frequently used dental software.

Web-based dental patients records management software has been proposed. The web-based records save the information for the patients 
in a central web server instead in the computer in the dental office.

After the introduction of the cloud system, patient records management is further simplified with the collection of patient data remotely prior to the patient visit to the dental practice and the integration of data using API's with the practice management system, this has eliminated the need of manual data entry and reduced billing errors. Commercially these type of systems are also known as paperless software systems.

Dental treatment planning software 
The usage of computer technologies for taking clinical decisions for the treatment of dental patients started at the end of the 1970s. The expert systems designed to enhance the treatment process, by providing the dental practitioner with a treatment plan are known as dental expert systems software. Today for more appropriate definition is supposed to be decision support systems, or DSS, and knowledge based systems (KBS). Such software products are designed for therapeutic dentistry, or prosthodontics.

Dental internet and ethernet communication software 
Telecommunication technologies found application in the medicine in the 1950s, which led to the defining of a new term: telemedicine. In 1997, Cook first used the term "teledentistry" and defines it as the practice to be used videoconference technologies for diagnosis placement or consultations for the treatment from destination. Different variations of medical and dental data interchange using internet are developed. It is expected this type of software will revolutionize the way for interchanging information between medical and dental practitioners. Today teledentistry includes activities such as information interchange by phone lines, fax machines, and transfer of computer based documents via the internet. 
There are also special software products, designed for communication and information interchange between dentists, and software products  designed to access dental information by the use of internet.

Computer-aided dental education 
Computer-assisted education is an element from the remote education. The term "electronic learning" or "e-learning" defines the usage of internet and multimedia in the educational course. Schleyer describes the learning with the help of computer software as a means for overcoming the faults of the traditional forms of education. 
In 1997 Cook wrote about the usage of videoconference technologies 
by the means of their usage for dental education. Today software for computer aided dental education are made 
for various dental specialities: orthodontics, dental imaging, 
endodontics, cariesology, oral pathology, pediatric dentistry, 
parodontology and prosthodontics.

Software for usage of dental instruments 
Instruments, used in dentistry, and needing software to operate are a large number of models of digital roentgenography hardware, intraoral cameras, various diagnostic hardware products such as for early caries detection, periodontal probes, CAD/CAM systems.

Digital smile design software 
Digital smile design is an emerging technology in dental surgery. Artificial intelligence and machine learning are helping dentists to design smiles with smile design software. Digital smile design is a technique used to design and modify the smile of patients using images and videos and help them visualize it beforehand by creating and presenting a digital mockup of their new smile design before their treatment starts.

Dental Disease Diagnosis Platform 
An AI-ML-powered dental app that provides dental disease diagnosis through camera images. You get an instant report on your oral health in-app, a few minutes, and a mirror! The AI-ML-powered app scans your mouth and gives you an oral hygiene score so that you know how to best take care of your teeth! Tele-Consultation with a Dentist without visiting a dental clinic are some advantages of these platforms. One of AI-ML-powered dental app is DentalDost app

References 

 
Electronic health record software